Theodora Whatmough Greene (19 November 1931 – 14 July 2005) was a chemist, most well known for authoring the book Protective Groups in Organic Synthesis, which summarises the use of protecting groups in organic synthesis.

Early life and education
Theodora Whatmough was born in Boston in 1931. She completed a bachelor’s degree at Radcliffe College and followed by a master’s degree at Harvard. In 1953, she married fellow chemist Frederick Greene, with whom she had four children.

Protective Groups in Organic Synthesis
In 1975, at the age of 44, Greene returned to science to undertake a PhD under the supervision of EJ Corey. She received  her  PhD  on  5 June  1980 whereupon she adapted her thesis into a book, Protective Groups in Organic Synthesis (John Wiley & Sons), published in 1981 and co-authored with Peter G. M. Wuts. Protective Groups, now in its fifth edition, has found its place as a common reference textbook in organic chemistry labs, where it is used as a guide for the selection of protecting groups.

References 

American women chemists
People from Boston
1931 births
2005 deaths
Radcliffe College alumni
20th-century American women
21st-century American women